The men's 100 metre breaststroke at the 2013 IPC Swimming World Championships was held at the Parc Jean Drapeau Aquatic Complex in Montreal from 12 to 18 August.

Medalists

See also
List of IPC world records in swimming

References

breaststroke 100 m men